Wydad Athletic de Fès is a Moroccan football club currently playing in the Second division.  The club was founded in 1948 and is located in the town of Fès.

Wydad Athletic Club de Fès (W.A.F) were promoted from the 2nd Division in 2008–09.

WAF
Wydad Fassi Sports Club is a football/sports club of the Moroccan city of Fès. This club was founded in 1948, and had for a while fallen on lean times, languishing in the shadows of Division 3 after having been one of the pillars of the national championship first division. They are the second Fès team, with the MAS Fès club having more success in recent time. They play in shirt of vertical black and white stripes.

Stadium

Their stadium, Complexe Sportif de Fès, is located at the southern end of the road to Sefrou (Trek Sefrou), built in a typical Moroccan style. Presentation of use accompanied by technical data, the sports complex of Fès was able to open its doors after much debate on the financing of its facilities. Located on an area of 40 hectares, the stadium can accommodate 45,000 spectators all seated. It has a running track in addition tartan annexes likely to host high-level competitions. 15 years after first breaking ceremony to launch construction work of this complex, which required an investment of 30 billion centimes (30 million), we are in front of a monument which was only dream.

Honours 
Moroccan Throne Cup
Runner-up: 2018

Squad
As of 2 April 2014.

Managers
 Charly Rössli (Oct 10, 2011 – May 21, 2012), (Nov 18, 2012 – May 10, 2013)
 Fathi Jamal (June 20, 2013 – Oct 11, 2013)
 Khalid Karama (Oct 11, 2013 – Feb 10, 2014)
 Fouad Sahabi (March 11, 2014–)

References

 
Football clubs in Morocco
Sport in Fez, Morocco
1948 establishments in Morocco
Sports clubs in Morocco
Association football clubs established in 1948